(born December 23, 1990) is a female wrestler from Japan. She won a silver medal at the 2010 World Wrestling Championships in Moscow.

References

External links
 

Living people
1990 births
Japanese female sport wrestlers
World Wrestling Championships medalists
21st-century Japanese women